Yanping Township is a mountain indigenous township in Taitung County, Taiwan. The main population is the Bunun people of the Taiwanese aborigines.

Administrative divisions
The township comprises five villages: Hongye, Luanshan, Taoyuan, Wuling and Yongkang. Luanshan Village is not an enclave as it connects to Taoyuan Village via the Luye Creek.

Tourist attractions
 Bunun Tribal Leisure Farm
 Dulan Mountain
 Hongye Hot Spring
 Hongye Teenage Baseball Memorial Hall
 Luming Suspension Bridge
 Tuoxian Leisure Farm

References

External links

Yanping Township Office

Townships in Taitung County